Žarko Jeličić (born 12 October 1983) is a Serbian football player.

References

External links
 

1983 births
Living people
Footballers from Belgrade
Serbian footballers
Association football midfielders
FK Radnički Pirot players
FK Zemun players
FK Donji Srem players
Serbian SuperLiga players
Expatriate footballers in Thailand